Sara Elizabeth Lowe (born April 30, 1984) is an American competitor in synchronized swimming. She was born in Desoto, Texas.

Lowe won an Olympic bronze medal at the 2004 Summer Olympics, in the team competition. She is also a coach at Stanford University for synchronized swimming.

References

1984 births
Living people
People from Dallas
Sportspeople from Texas
Olympic bronze medalists for the United States in synchronized swimming
American synchronized swimmers
Synchronized swimmers at the 2004 Summer Olympics
Medalists at the 2004 Summer Olympics